Ethmia clava is a moth in the family Depressariidae. It is found in Mexico.

The dorsal pale area of the forewings is gray, but narrowly white adjacent to the brown markings. The costal area is blackish brown. The ground color of the hindwings is dark gray-brown.

References

Moths described in 1973
clava